Leptodactylus bufonius is a species of frog in the family Leptodactylidae.
It is found in Argentina, Bolivia, Brazil, and Paraguay.
Its natural habitats are subtropical or tropical dry shrubland, subtropical or tropical dry lowland grassland, intermittent freshwater lakes, freshwater marshes, pastureland, and ponds.

References

bufonius
Taxonomy articles created by Polbot
Amphibians described in 1894